What's for Dinner? (also known as Serve Me or Give Me Food) is a South Korean television series that aired on MBC in 2009.

Cast

Main cast
 Ha Hee-ra as Jo Young-ran
 Kim Hyeseon as Jo Young-shim
 Oh Yoon-ah as Jo Young-mi
 Kim Sung-min as Jung Sun-woo
 Kim Byung-se as Bae Do-suk
 Ha Seok-jin as Kim Yoon-soo

Extended cast
 Lee Hye-sook as Yoon Mi-hee
 Lee Hyo-choon as Park Soon-ja
 Han In-soo as Hwang Jong-gap
 Choi Soo-rin as Cha Hwa-jin
 Ha Seung-ri as Jung Eun-ji
 Lee Byung-joon as Jo Hyun-tae
 Kwon Oh-min as Bae Woong
 Hong Soo-min as Im Jung-hee
 Kim Young-ki as Kang Hyung-sa
 Cho Yeon-woo as Yoo Joon-hee
 Lee Hyun-woo as Tommy

See also
 List of South Korean television series

International broadcast
 It aired in Vietnam on VTV3 channel from November 18, 2009, called: Tối nay ăn gì?

References

External links
  

MBC TV television dramas
2009 South Korean television series debuts
2009 South Korean television series endings
Korean-language television shows
South Korean romance television series